is the 9th single from Ayaka. It was released on May 14, 2008.

Overview
Okaeri is used as the theme song for the drama series, Zettai Kareshi. Ayaka was asked by Yuu Watase, the manga artist of Zettai Kareshi, to create a theme song. She wrote the song with her music producer after reading the whole series. First press contains a special photo card.

Track listing

References

2008 singles
Ayaka songs
Japanese television drama theme songs
2008 songs
Songs written by Ayaka
Warner Music Japan singles